Shalom bayit (also sholom bayit or shlom bayit, or (Yiddish) sholom bayis or shlom bayis) is the Jewish religious concept of domestic harmony and good relations between husband and wife. In a Jewish court of law, shalom bayit is the Hebrew term for marital reconciliation.

Origin of term
The term sh'lom beto is found in the Talmud regarding domestic peace in general. Nowadays, it is mostly used regarding matrimonial peace.

As a Jewish value
Throughout the history of the Jewish people, Jews have held an ideal standard for Jewish family life that is manifested in the term shalom bayit. Shalom bayit signifies completeness, wholeness, and fulfillment. Hence, the traditional Jewish marriage is characterized by peace, nurturing, respect, and chesed (roughly meaning kindness, more accurately loving-kindness), through which a married couple becomes complete. It is believed that God's presence dwells in a pure and loving home

In Jewish culture, a marriage is described as a "match made in heaven," and is treated as a holy enterprise. For example, the Jewish betrothal ceremony is referred to in classical rabbinic literature as Kiddushin (meaning hallowing / sanctification / consecration). By declaring the marriage union sacred, a couple stands sanctified before God. It is in a relationship where both husband and wife recognize each other as creations in God's image and treat each other accordingly that true sanctity emanates forth. Moreover, this sanctity of the marital union reminds the Jewish husband and wife to express their holiness through marriage and to build a home based on mutual love, respect, and chesed.

In practice 
The greatest praise the Talmudic rabbis offered to any woman was that given to a wife that fulfils the wishes of her husband. The husband too was expected to love his wife as much as he loves himself, and honour her more than he honours himself; indeed, one who honours his wife was said, by the classical rabbis, to be rewarded with wealth. Similarly, a husband was expected to discuss with his wife any worldly matters that might arise in his life.

Tough love was frowned upon; the Talmud forbids a husband from being overbearing to his household, and domestic abuse by him was also condemned. It was said of a wife that God counts her tears.

In the Midrash 
In Jewish thought and law, domestic harmony is an important goal; to this end, an early midrash argues that a wife should not leave the home too frequently. 

The goal may even warrant engaging in a "white lie". According to the Talmud, when God tells Sarah she will give birth to a son, she expresses disbelief, saying: "After I am waxed old shall I have pleasure, my husband being old also?"  But when God speaks to Abraham, he says: "Why did Sarah laugh and say, 'Will I really have a child, now that I am old?" (Genesis: 18:12-13). The rabbis comment that God omitted Sarah's mention of Abraham's age out of concern for their shalom bayit.

See also
Jewish view of marriage
Get (divorce document)

References

External links
 Chabad.org: Marital Harmony
 Shalom Bayit: Ending Domestic Violence in Jewish Homes

Jewish marital law
Hebrew words and phrases
Reconciliation